117th meridian may refer to:

117th meridian east, a line of longitude east of the Greenwich Meridian
117th meridian west, a line of longitude west of the Greenwich Meridian